Valira may refer to:
 Valira, Greece
 Gran Valira, the largest river in Andorra